Vaccenic acid is a naturally occurring trans fatty acid. It is the predominant kind of trans-fatty acid found in human milk, in the fat of ruminants, and in dairy products such as milk, butter, and yogurt.
Trans fat in human milk may depend on trans fat content in food. 

Its IUPAC name is (11E)-11-octadecenoic acid, and its lipid shorthand name is 18:1 trans-11.  The name was derived from the Latin vacca (cow).

Vaccenic acid was discovered in 1928 in animal fats and butter.  
Mammals convert it into rumenic acid, a conjugated linoleic acid,
where it shows anticarcinogenic properties.

Its stereoisomer, cis-vaccenic acid, an omega-7 fatty acid, is found in Sea Buckthorn (Hippophae rhamnoides) oil.  Its IUPAC name is (11Z)-11-octadecenoic acid, and its lipid shorthand name is 18:1 cis-11.

Health
Vaccenic acid is also found in human orbitofrontal cortex of patients with bipolar disorder and schizophrenia.

Alkaline phosphatase inhibited 25% by vaccenic acid in osteoblasts.

Oxidation of omega-7 unsaturated fatty acids on the skin surface, such as palmitoleic acid and vaccenic acid, may be the cause of the phenomenon commonly known as old person smell.

When fed vaccenic acid over 16 weeks, rats exhibited in lowered total cholesterol, lowered LDL cholesterol and lower triglyceride levels.

Two Canadian studies have shown that vaccenic acid could be beneficial compared to vegetable shortenings containing trans fats, or a mixture of pork lard and soy fat, by lowering total LDL and triglyceride levels. A study by the US Department of Agriculture showed that vaccenic acid raises both HDL and LDL cholesterol, whereas industrial trans fats only raise LDL with no beneficial effect on HDL.

References

Fatty acids
Animal fats
Dairy products
Alkenoic acids